Mordellistena attenuata is a species of beetle in the family Mordellidae. It is in the genus Mordellistena. It was described in 1824 by Thomas Say.

References

attenuata
Beetles described in 1824
Taxa named by Thomas Say